The 1999 UEFA Cup Final was an association football match played on 12 May 1999 at the Luzhniki Stadium in Moscow to determine the winners of the 1998–99 UEFA Cup. The match was contested by Parma of Italy and Marseille of France. Parma won the match 3–0 to claim their second UEFA Cup and fourth European trophy, having previously won the UEFA Cup Winners' Cup and the UEFA Super Cup on one occasion each. There were 61,000 spectators at the match, making it the highest-attended single-legged UEFA Cup/Europa League final.

Background
This was Parma's second UEFA Cup final, having defeated Juventus in 1995. Marseille had won the UEFA Champions League in 1993. 

The Luzhniki Stadium in Moscow, Russia played host to the match, having never previously hosted a major European final.

Route to the final

Match

Team selection
While Parma's selection for the match was more straightforward, underdogs Marseille had four players suspended for the final after the team's semi-final victory over Bologna, which ended in a fight in the players' tunnel at the Stadio Renato Dall'Ara. Fabrizio Ravanelli and William Gallas both received yellow cards which barred their participation in the final. Christophe Dugarry and Hamada Jambay would serve the first match of their respective and five- and four-match suspensions on the sidelines for the final for their involvement in the brawl.

Summary
Hugh Dallas, the Scottish referee who had also officiated in the Franco-Italian 1998 World Cup quarter-final, conducted the coin toss, which was won by Marseille captain Laurent Blanc and the Frenchman elected to shoot towards his team's own fans in the second half. Roberto Sensini, Parma's captain, chose to kick the match off.

The first 25 minutes saw a cautious Marseille side play much of their football in their own half, only to knock it long to their isolated frontmen Robert Pires and Florian Maurice. Following such an occasion, Sensini hit a long ball forward towards Juan Sebastián Verón, whose headed flick-on looked not to be dangerous until a lazy headed backpass from the experienced Laurent Blanc gifted Hernán Crespo one-on-one with the keeper; the Argentine coolly lobbed Stéphane Porato with his first touch to give Parma the lead after 26 minutes.

Ten minutes later, as the Italians continued to dominate the match, a Parma attack twice looked to have been ended by Marseille's defence, but the ball found Lilian Thuram in an advanced right-back position on both occasions. On the second occasion, Thuram was able to slide in to find Diego Fuser five yards from the byline and just onside. He whipped in a deep cross, and Paolo Vanoli directed his header past Marseille's goalkeeper into the net to double Parma's advantage.

Five minutes before the hour mark, Thuram surged forward down the right before giving the ball to Verón outside him. Verón chipped the ball into the penalty area with a ball looking to be destined for Crespo's boot, a fine dummy duped the Marseille's defence and gave Enrico Chiesa the opportunity to volley home emphatically from 12 yards to make it 3–0 and seal a Parma victory.

Details

See also
1998–99 UEFA Cup
Olympique de Marseille in European football
Parma Calcio 1913 in European football

References

External links
1998–99 season at UEFA.com

2
Uefa Cup Final 1999
Uefa Cup Final 1999
Uefa Cup Final 1999
1999
Uefa
Final
1999 in Moscow
May 1999 sports events in Europe
Sports competitions in Moscow